Bernard Michaux (7 September 1921 – 15 August 1987) was a Luxembourgian footballer. He competed in the men's tournament at the 1948 Summer Olympics.

References

External links
 

1921 births
1987 deaths
Luxembourgian footballers
Luxembourg international footballers
Olympic footballers of Luxembourg
Footballers at the 1948 Summer Olympics
People from Dudelange
Association football goalkeepers
Luxembourgian football managers